The 1985–86 Auburn Tigers men's basketball team represented Auburn University in the 1985–86 college basketball season. The team's head coach was Sonny Smith, who was in his eighth season at Auburn. The team played their home games at Memorial Coliseum in Auburn, Alabama. They finished the season 22–11, 13–5 in SEC play. They lost to Mississippi State in the quarterfinals of the SEC tournament. They received an at-large bid to the NCAA tournament where they defeated Arizona, St. John's, and UNLV to advance to the Elite Eight where they lost to Louisville.

The only real loss of note from the prior season for Auburn was starting center Carey Holland.  Also, center Darren Guest would be found academically ineligible and eventually transfer.  Key additions were freshman forward Mike Jones and guard Aundrae Davis, a sophomore transfer from West Virginia University who would not be eligible until the next season.  Senior Chuck Person would have a stellar season and make several All-America teams.

Roster

Schedule and results

|-
!colspan=12 style=| Regular season

|-
!colspan=12 style=| SEC Tournament

|-
!colspan=12 style=| NCAA Tournament

Sources

Team players in the NBA draft

References

Auburn Tigers men's basketball seasons
Auburn
Auburn
Auburn Tigers
Auburn Tigers